MSA Bermagui (1121) was an auxiliary minesweeper operated by the Royal Australian Navy (RAN). Launched in 1973 as Nadgee II, the vessel was operated commercially as a tuna-fishing boat until March 1994, when she was acquired under the RAN's Craft of Opportunity Program for use as an auxiliary. During military service, she had a crew of eight. The ship left service in 2000. Bermagui was sold at auction for A$190,000 in April 2000, to Mosman Bay Boat Charters.

References

Minesweepers of the Royal Australian Navy
Fishing ships of Australia
1973 ships